Duane M. Klueh (born January 6, 1926) is an American retired basketball player and coach. Born in Bottineau, North Dakota, he was raised in Terre Haute, Indiana and still lives there today; he was the head men's basketball coach at Indiana State University for 12 seasons (1955–1967).  As a Head Coach, he remains the leader in wins.  Klueh played professionally in the NBA from 1949 to 1951.

Basketball career
He had a spectacular Collegiate career; as a Junior (1947–48) he was #2 in the nation in points scored (597), while ranking #10 in point-per-game (17.6).  After leading the Sycamores to the NAIA Finals, he was selected 'All-American' by the Helms Foundation as well as winning the Chuck Taylor Most Valuable Player Award in the 1948 NAIA tournament.

Klueh was taken in the eighth round of the 1949 NBA draft by the Boston Celtics. He never played for the Celtics, but was a member of the Denver Nuggets and Fort Wayne Pistons; averaging over 8 pts during his (2-yr) career.

After his NBA career ended, he returned to Indiana and accepted his first coaching position at Fowler High School in Benton County, Indiana.  He was named the Indiana State Head Coach after the 1954–55 season at age 28.  He resigned at age 40 (1966–67) citing the rigors and pressures of recruiting.

During his twelve-year tenure, he led the Sycamores to a cumulative record of 182-122, 71-60 in conference play.  He won three conference titles and had five post-season berths; his post-season record was 3-6.  He also led the Sycamores through their transition from the NAIA to the NCAA.

He is a member of the Indiana Basketball Hall of Fame, the Missouri Valley Conference Hall of Fame the NAIA Hall of Fame and was a charter inductee to the Indiana State University Hall of Fame in 1982.

His jersey #54 is only one of three numbers retired by Indiana State University.

He held the career scoring record when he graduated in 1948 and is still in the Top Ten in total points (#9; 1,432 points) and scoring average (#10; 15.7 ppg).

Tennis career
In addition to his success on the collegiate hardwood, Klueh also enjoyed a standout career in tennis; winning the 1948 Little States (Collegiate) Singles Championship in Indiana.

He returned to ISU following his professional basketball career and assumed the role of head tennis coach, leading the Sycamores to a school-record 278 wins during two coaching tenures totaling over 26 seasons. ISU's on-campus tennis complex, constructed in 1996, bears his name.

Head coaching record

References

External links
 

1926 births
Living people
All-American college men's basketball players
American men's basketball coaches
American men's basketball players
American tennis coaches
Basketball coaches from Indiana
Basketball players from Indiana
Boston Celtics draft picks
College men's basketball head coaches in the United States
High school basketball coaches in Indiana
Denver Nuggets (1948–1950) players
Fort Wayne Pistons players
Guards (basketball)
Indiana State Sycamores men's basketball coaches
Indiana State Sycamores men's basketball players
People from Bottineau County, North Dakota
Tennis coaches from Indiana